Africa's Richest Kings is a ranking of Africa's wealthiest monarchs, compiled and published by the American business magazine, Forbes, in March 2014.  The total net worth of each individual on the list is estimated, in United States dollars, based on their assets and accounting for debt.  Politicians and dictators whose wealth comes from their positions are excluded from this list, as the term king is deemed by the evaluators  to refer to either sovereign or constituent monarchs who reign due to monarchical tradition.

As of March 2014, King Mohammed VI of Morocco topped the list with US$2 billion, while Nigerian oil magnate King Fredrick Obateru Akinruntan, the Olugbo of the Ugbo Kingdom, came second on the list with $300 million. He surpassed fellow Nigerian King Olubuse II, the Ooni of Ife, worth at least $75 million and the Ngwenyama of Eswatini, King Mswati III, who was himself worth at least $50 million. Rounding out the top five was the Ghanaian King Osei Tutu II, Asantehene of the Ashanti, with $10 million.

In the time since the period of evaluation, Olubuse II has died. He was succeeded as the Ooni by King Ojaja II, a distant relative, although the personal wealth that was evaluated went to his lineal heirs in the Sijuade family.

References

Lists of 21st-century people
Forbes lists